Regina José Galindo (born August 27, 1974) is a Guatemalan performance artist who specializes in body art. She was born in Guatemala City.

Early work 
Remarkably, for an artist who is known for the political themes of her work, Galindo grew up in a lower middle class household where politics generally, and the Guatemalan civil war more specifically, were not discussed. She attended secretarial school and her career as a secretary was not a successful one. Her work as a poet developed through attending workshops and groups which met in friends' houses, at which time she wrote the pieces that became part of her book Personal and Intransmisible.

After meeting Jessica Lagunas and Maria Adela Díaz, performance art grew in importance in her practice. Aníbal López (also known as A-1 53167) has been a good friend for Galindo, and is noted as an important influence on her work. Galindo's first performances were based upon her earlier written works.

Performances
She first gave two performances in Guatemala in 1999, and gained international fame. One of her well-known acts include ¿Quién Puede Borrar las Huellas? (Translated: "Who Can Erase the Traces"), from 2003, in which she walked from the Congress of Guatemala building to the National Palace, dipping her bare feet at intervals in a white basin full of human blood as a vigorous protest against the presidential candidacy of Guatemala’s former dictator José Efraín Ríos Montt.

Another of her notable works was titled Perra (2005), in which she carved the Spanish word perra, or bitch, on her legs, in protest against violence against women.

She frequently collaborates with other art performers, including compatriot Aníbal López.

List of solo exhibitions

List of group exhibitions 
In October 2008, Galindo exhibited alongside renowned artists like Tania Bruguera and Jimmie Durham at MoMA PS1 for NeoHooDoo: Art for a Forgotten Faith, an exhibition co-organized by The Menil Collection.

Between March 25 and June 8, 2014, Padiglione d'Arte Contemporanea (PAC) exhibited a selection of Galindo's work in Estoy Viva. The show was divided in five sections: Politics, Woman, Violence, Organic and Death. Works such as ¿Quién puede borrar las huellas? (Who can erase the traces?, 2003), Himenoplastia (2004), Mientras, ellos siguen libres (While they are still free, 2007) and Caparazon (Shell, 2010) were presented alongside newer works that had not been exhibited before in Italy.

In January of 2020, Galindo was part of Artpace’s exhibit titled Visibilities: Intrepid Women of Artpace. Curated by Erin K. Murphy, Visibilities not only kicks off the nonprofit's 25th anniversary celebration, but also highlights past artists from their International Artist-in-Residency program, such as Galindo who was a resident in Spring 2008. In Visibilities, a video that Galindo created during the 2008 residency is being showcased at Artpace for the first time.

Recognition
Galindo received the Golden Lion award at the Venice Biennale in 2005, in the category of “artists under 30”, for her video Himenoplastia. This work, nevertheless, got a particularly hostile reception during its first showing in Guatemala, in 2004. The controversial work depicted surgical reconstruction of the artist’s hymen.

In October 2009, Exit Art showed a solo exhibition of Galindo's work as part of their SOLO series and Performance in Crisis program.

A book on Galindo’s performance work has been published in Italy (Vanilla Edizioni, 2006). Galindo is also a writer of poetry and narrative; in 1998 she received the Myrna Mack Foundation's Premio Unico de Poesía in Guatemala for Personal e intransmisible (Scripta Coloquia, 2000).

In 2011 the jury of the 29th Biennial of Graphic Arts in Ljubljana (Dave Beech, Christian Höller, Urška Jurman, and Ulay /Frank Uwe Laysiepen/) awarded her with the Grand Prize for the works: Confesión (Confession), 2007 which was produced in Spain and inspired by the extraordinary rendition flights uncovered by a team of local reporters in Palma de Mallorca, and the Prince Claus Awards.

List of works

See also
Live Art
Performance Art
Conceptual Art
Body Art

Bibliography 
 Cazali, Rosina, and Fernando Castro Florez. Regina José Galindo. Milan: Silvana Editoriale, 2011. Print.
 Díaz, Tamara, and Virginia Pérez-Ratton. "Regina Galindo: Toque De Queda (2005), Perra (2005), Un Espejo Para La Pequeña Muerte (2006)." Estrecho Dudoso. Costa Rica: TEOR/éTica, 2006. 60-61. Print.
 Sileo, Diego, and Eugenio Viola. Regina José Galindo: Estoy Viva. Milan: Skira, 2014. Print.
 Siviero, Viviana, and Marco Scotini. Regina José Galindo. Albissola Marina: Vanillaedizioni, 2006. Print.
 Villena Fiengo, Sergio, Regina José Galindo. El performance como acto de resistencia. Revista Centroamericana de Ciencias Sociales, Vol. VII, nº 1, 2010, https://www.academia.edu/3465907/Regina_Galindo._El_performance_como_acto_de_resistencia
 Villena Fiengo, Sergio, "Intervenciones intempestivas en Centro América. El anti-ceremonial público en la obra de Regina Galindo", Revista de Estudios Globales & Arte Contemporáneo, Vol. 3, nº 1, 2015, https://www.academia.edu/26755279/EL_ANTI-CEREMONIAL_PÚBLICO_EN_LA_OBRA_DE_REGINA_JOSÉ_GALINDO_2016_

References

External links
 
Profile at Literatura Guatemalteca  
Article at Parvis.net
BOMB Magazine article
Projects by Regina José Galindo in Spain
The Artist.org Entry of Galindo
Artist listing at Prometeogallery di Ida Pisani, the Italian gallery representing Regina José Galindo
Video documentation of Regina José Galindo's Big Bang at MFA Boston, June 25, 2014.

1974 births
Living people
Feminist artists
Women performance artists
Guatemalan women artists
Guatemalan contemporary artists
People from Guatemala City
Guatemalan artists
Walking artists